Anne-Cécile Ciofani  (born 14 December 1993) is a French rugby player. She was awarded World Rugby Women’s Sevens Player of the Year for 2021.

Life 
She discovered rugby at age 18 when she started studying Science and technology of physical and sports activities (STAPS), while she practiced the heptathlon: 

Six months after her debut, however, she is summoned to the Elite Center of Marcoussis, but is only selected in the national team in 2018.

In 2018, when she finished her first year as a professional player at AC Bobigny, she became vice-champion of the world of rugby 7 with the France team. She scored a test on the last action in the game against Australia, Olympic champion, which qualified France in the final and was elected best new player of the world tournament.

She came from a sporting family, both parents participated in Olympiads, her father Walter Ciofani in the hammer throw in Los Angeles in 1984, and her Cameroonian mother Jeanne Ngo Minyemeck in women's shot put and the women's discus throw at Seoul in 1988. Her sisters Juliette (Junior French Champion) and Audrey Ciofani (French Champion Hope and Vice Elite Champion) are athletes at the hammer throw and licensed at the Athletic Circle of Montreuil 93.

References

External links 

 
 
 
 
 

1993 births
Living people
Sportspeople from Seine-Saint-Denis
French rugby sevens players
Female rugby sevens players
French sportspeople of Cameroonian descent
Rugby sevens players at the 2020 Summer Olympics
Medalists at the 2020 Summer Olympics
Olympic rugby sevens players of France
Olympic silver medalists for France
Olympic medalists in rugby sevens
France international women's rugby sevens players